"Impermeable" is a song recorded by American duo Ha*Ash. It was released on March 21, 2011 as the first of the single from their fourth studio album A Tiempo (2011). It was written by Áureo Baqueiro and Daniela Blau.

Background and release 
"Impermeable" it was written by Áureo Baqueiro and Daniela Blau while its production was done by Baqueiro. Is a song recorded by American duo Ha*Ash from her fourth studio album A Tiempo (2011). It was released as the lead single from the album on March 21, 2011, by Sony Music Entertainment.

Commercial performance 
The track peaked at number one on the Mexican Singles Chart, and Monitor Latino. The track peaked at number 6 in the Mexico Airplay. In 2012 the song was certified gold in Mexico.

Music video 
A music video for "Impermeable" was released on May 4, 2011. The video was filmed in Hotel W on Mexico City. It was directed by Fausto Terán. , the video has over 44 million views on YouTube.

The second music video for "Impermeable", recorded live for the album A Tiempo Edition Deluxe, was released on August 1, 2011. , the video has over 8 million views on YouTube.

Credits and personnel 
Credits adapted from AllMusic and Genius.

Recording and management

 Recording Country: United States
 Sony / ATV Discos Music Publishing LLC / Westwood Publishing
 (P) 2011 Sony Music Entertainment México, S.A. De C.V. (studio version)

Ha*Ash
 Ashley Grace  – vocals, guitar
 Hanna Nicole  – vocals, guitar
Additional personnel
 Áureo Baqueiro  – songwriting, production, piano 
 Daniela Blau  – songwriting 
 Rene García  – bass, guitar, drums

Charts

Certifications

Awards and nominations

Release history

References 

Ha*Ash songs
2011 songs
2011 singles
Songs written by Áureo Baqueiro
Song recordings produced by Áureo Baqueiro
Spanish-language songs
Pop ballads
Sony Music Latin singles
Monitor Latino Top General number-one singles